This is a list of notable people who have participated in masters athletics. Most have achieved their primary notoriety through athletic endeavors except when noted.

 Luciano Acquarone 
 Aimo Aho 
 Gabriela Andersen-Schiess 
 Henry Andrade  
 Birger Asplund 
 Doris Auer 
 Charles Austin 
 Rink Babka 
 Lee Baca  Los Angeles County Sheriff
 Bob Backus 
 Lawrence Baird 
 Thane Baker 
 Willie Banks 
 Arthur Barnard 
 James Barrineau 
 Jack Bacheler 
 Dieter Baumann 
 Tim Berrett 
 Nataša Bezjak 
 Laurie Binder 
 Chris Black 
 Peter Blank 
 Meeri Bodelid 
 Viktor Bolshov  
 Charlie Booth  inventor of Starting Blocks
 Lamberto Boranga 
 Christa Bortignon 
 Mary Bowermaster 
 Roald Bradstock   Artist
 Norman Bright 
 Debbie Brill 
 Benny Brown 
 Arto Bryggare 
 Zola Budd 
 Ed Burke 
 Billie Ann Burrill  
 Rich Busa 
 Arild Busterud 
 Tom Byers 
 John Carlos 
 Gary Carlsen 
 Angelo Carosi 
 David Carr 
 Ed Caruthers 
 Dwain Chambers 
 Harold Chapson 
 Yelizaveta Chernyshova  
 Lydia Cheromei 
 Rosemary Chrimes 
 Todd Christensen  American Football
 Dick Cochran 
 Eamonn Coghlan  
 Leon Coleman 
 Bill Collins 
 Phil Conley 
 Harold Connolly 
 Ted Corbitt 
 Bill Cosby  Comedian
 Alan Cranston  U.S. Senator
 Josh Culbreath 
 Toshiko D'Elia 
 Maria Pia D'Orlando 
 Tamara Danilova  
 Jeanne Daprano 
 Willie Davenport 
 Gerry Davidson 
 Mary Decker-Slaney 
 Colleen De Reuck  
 Maureen de St. Croix 
 Elliott Denman 
 Ken Dennis 
 Ángel Díaz 
 Grace-Ann Dinkins    also Trauma Surgeon
 Rod Dixon 
 Walter Dix 
 Fabrizio Donato 
 Anthony Dorsett  American Football
 Aleksandr Dryhol  
 Charles Dumas 
 Ludmila Engquist   
 Andrés Espinosa 
 Saskia Estupinan  Public Health Doctor
 Laverne Eve 
 Lee Evans (sprinter) 
 Mohamed Ezzher 
 Earl Fee 
 Nuria Fernández 
 Maria Magnólia Figueiredo 
 Frederico Fischer 
 Dick Fosbury 
 Jack Foster 
 Ruth Frith  Centenarian, World's Oldest Female Athlete
 Gabre Gabric  Centenarian
 Tom Gage 
 Willie Gault   also American Football Player
 Fortune Gordien 
 Miki Gorman 
 Ivy Granstrom 
 Dalton Grant 
 Johnny Gray   Oct 2000 Ran Masters Mile (Run For Children) as a M40. Holds Masters M35 Record achieved as an Open competitor
 Norm Green 
 Jack Greenwood 
 Jim Grelle 
 Viktor Gruzenkin 
 Albert Hall (athlete) 
 Kozo Haraguchi 
 Eddie Hart 
 Alisa Harvey-Hill 
 Larry Hart (athlete) 
 Dawn Hartigan 
 Rex Harvey  also Official and Administrator
 Ray Hatton  Born in 
 Robert Hecker  Musician
 Bud Held  also Inventor and Entrepreneur
 James Chico Hernandez  Wrestler
 Hal Higdon  also Sports Writer
 Ron Hill 
 Jim Hines 
 Russ Hodge 
 Maurice Houvion 
 Bob Humphreys 
 Guy Husson 
 Ayanna Hutchinson 
 Hubert Indra 
 Rıza Maksut İşman 
 Ivan Ivančić   
 April Jace  Celebrity murder victim
 Regina Jacobs 
 Kip Janvrin 
 Erwin Jaskulski  Centenarian
 Billy Johnson   American Football Player
 Tebbs Lloyd Johnson 
 Payton Jordan 
 Monica Joyce   
 Regina Joyce  Olympian for  
 Al Joyner 
 Gitte Karlshøj 
 Dimitrios Kattis 
 Ryszard Katus 
 Ida Keeling  Centenarian
 Johnny Kelley 
 Patrick C. Kennell   Academic
 John Keston   British Actor
 Ray Kimble 
 James King 
 Roger Kingdom 
 Mark Kiptoo 
 Herb Kirk  World's oldest runner
 Wolfgang Knabe 
 Peter Koech 
 Mariya Konovalova 
 Olga Kotelko 
 Galina Kovalenskaya 
 Stanisław Kowalski  Centenarian, World's Oldest Athlete
 June Krauser  "Mother of Masters swimming"
 Marty Krulee 
 Shaul Ladany  
 Ron Laird 
 Francie Larrieu-Smith 
 Bev LaVeck 
 Evelyn Lawler   Mother of Carl Lewis and Carol Lewis
 Fred Lebow   New York Marathon event director
 Nicole Lévêque 
 Gerry Lindgren 
 James Lofton   also Hall of Fame American Football Player
 Jud Logan 
 Mihaela Loghin 
 Mario Longo 
 Arne Lothe 
 Horst Mandl 
 Mike Manley 
 Pat Manson 
 José Marín 
 Marsha Mark-Baird 
 Peter Marsh  Academic, Sociologist
 John Martel   Lawyer and Novelist
 Marie Mathieu 
 Ralph Maxwell  Judge
 Bill McChesney 
 Phil McConkey   American Football Player
 Anne McKenzie 
 James McNamara 
 Leland McPhie  Centenarian
 Delano Meriwether  also Physician
 E. Gerald Meyer  Centenarian
 Marie-Louise Michelsohn  Mathematician
 Alain Mimoun 
 Victoria Mitchell 
 Hidekichi Miyazaki  Centenarian
 Felicia Țilea-Moldovan  
 Martín Mondragón 
 David Moorcroft 
 Boo Morcom 
 Carol Moseke (Frost) USA
 Sylvia Mosqueda 
 Phil Mulkey 
 Kenneth Mungara 
 Fabiana Murer
 Sandra Myers 
 Iryna Mykhalchenko 
 Larry Myricks 
 Fidelis Ndyabagye 
 Nick Newton  Inventor
 Jamie Nieto 
 Doug Nordquist 
 Gary Null  Author/Pundit
 Nadine O'Connor 
 Irene Obera 
 Al Oerter 
 Vera Olenchenko   
 Brian Oldfield  Competed at a June 1978 Masters Meet. Holds two Masters World Records
 Marcus O'Sullivan 
 Giuseppe Ottaviani (athlete) Italian
 Evy Palm 
 Ladislav Pataki 
 Dodyu Patarinski 
 Tom Patsalis 
 Donald Pellmann  Centenarian
 Elisabetta Perrone 
 Steve Peters  Sports psychiatrist
 Lyudmila Petrova 
 Florence Picaut 
 Dmitry Pietrman   Futbol/Soccer club owner
 Simon Poelman 
 Valbjörn Þorláksson 
 Bernardine Portenski 
 Patricia Porter 
 Caroline Powell 
 Tatyana Pozdnyakova  
 Alfred Proksch 
 Philip Rabinowitz  Centenarian
 Carmelo Rado 
 Philipa Raschker 
 Lucien Rault 
 Pam Reed 
 Marian Shields Robinson  Mother of current U.S. First Lady
 Bill Rodgers 
 Gaston Roelants 
 Orville Rogers  Centenarian  
 Henry Rono 
 Nick Rose 
 Anne Chatrine Rühlow 
 Jim Ryun  also U.S. Congressman
 Joan Benoit Samuelson 
 Ugo Sansonetti 
 Enrico Saraceni 
 Willi Sawall 
 Silke Schmidt 
 Bob Schul 
 Steve Scott 
 Helen Searle 
 Yuriy Sedykh 
 Marco Segatel 
 Iryna Sekachova 
 Vyacheslav Shabunin 
 Nolan Shaheed  Jazz trumpeter
 George A. Sheehan  Running Writer
 Frank Shorter 
 Zdeňka Šilhavá 
 Jay Silvester 
 Fauja Singh  
 Chuck Smead 
 Joyce Smith 
 Karl Smith 
 Marjorie Parker Smith   Dancer/Figure Skater
 Peter Snell 
 Jim Sorensen 
 Fred Sowerby  
 Mattias Sunneborn 
 Paul Spangler  
 Sasha Springer-Jones 
 Walt Stack 
 Kjell-Erik Ståhl 
 Brian Stanton 
 Rudolf Steiner 
 Gary Stenlund 
 Dwight Stones 
 Ed Stotsenberg  Philanthropist
 Larry Stuart 
 Jüri Tamm 
 Tatyana Ter-Mesrobyan 
 Valbjörn Þorláksson 
 Domingo Tibaduiza 
 Milan Tiff 
 Felicia Ţilea-Moldovan 
 Bogdan Tudor 
 Derek Turnbull 
 Gary Tuttle 
 Teresa Vaill 
 Martti Vainio 
 Venelina Veneva-Mateeva 
 Sandro Viana 
 Sean Wade  
 Bill Wambach 
 Cornelius "Dutch" Warmerdam 
 Sylvia Weiner  
 Priscilla Welch 
 Georg Werthner 
 Anthony Whiteman 
 Ed Whitlock 
 Ron Whitney 
 John Whittemore  World's Oldest Athlete
 Novlene Williams-Mills 
 Gerhard Windolf 
 Ruth Wysocki 
 Iryna Yatchenko 
 Dimitrion Yordanidis 
 Emmerich Zensch

Open Athletes
These are athletes who have not competed as a Masters athlete, but by age qualify for and hold Masters records set in elite open level competition.

 Yamilé Aldama    Holds Masters W35 and W40 Record achieved as an Open competitor
 Virgilijus Alekna  Holds Masters M35 Record achieved as an Open competitor
 Igor Astapkovich  has not competed in a Masters event but holds two Masters World Records
 Inha Babakova  Holds Masters W35 Record achieved as an Open competitor
 Abdellah Béhar  Holds Masters M35 Record achieved as an Open competitor
 Mike Boit  Holds Masters M35 Record achieved as an Open competitor
 Sabine Braun  Holds Masters W35 Record achieved as an Open competitor
 Chris Brown   Holds Masters M35 Record achieved as an Open competitor
 Amber Campbell  Holds Masters W35 Record achieved as an Open competitor
 Linford Christie  Holds Masters M35 Record achieved as an Open competitor
 Jearl Miles Clark  Holds Masters W35 Record achieved as an Open competitor
 Kim Collins  Holds pending Masters M35 Record achieved as an Open competitor
 Maurizio Damilano  Holds Masters M35 Record achieved as an Open competitor
 Yohann Diniz  Has multiple pending Masters records
 Troy Douglas  has not competed in a Masters event but holds two Masters World Records
 Joanne Dow  Holds Masters W40 and W45 Records achieved as an Open competitor
 Stacy Dragila  Holds Masters W35 Record achieved as an Open competitor
 Heike Drechsler  Holds Masters W35 Record achieved as an Open competitor
 Jonathan Edwards  Holds Masters M35 Record achieved as an Open competitor
 Ludmila Engquist  Holds Masters W35 Record achieved as an Open competitor
 Haile Gebrselassie  Holds Masters M35 Record achieved as an Open competitor
 Lyubov Gurina  Holds Masters W35 Record achieved as an Open competitor
 Alvin Harrison    Holds a pending Masters M35 Record achieved as an Open competitor
 Jeff Hartwig   Holds Masters M35 Record achieved as an Open competitor
 Colin Jackson  Held Masters M35 Record achieved as an Open competitor
 Allen Johnson  Holds Masters M35 Record achieved as an Open competitor, set while winning IAAF World Cup
 Meb Keflezighi  American M40 Marathon record holder, ran in 2016 Olympics at age 41
 Mary Jepkosgei Keitany  Pending marathon record set as open competitor
 Robert Korzeniowski  Holds Masters M35 Record achieved as an Open competitor
 Inessa Kravets  Holds Masters W35 Record achieved as an Open competitor
 Olga Kuzenkova   Holds Masters W35 Record achieved as an Open competitor
 A. G. Kruger   Holds Masters M35 Record in Throws Pentathlon as Open competitor
 Bernard Lagat    Holds multiple Masters M35 Records achieved as an Open competitor
 Carl Lewis   Holds Masters M35 Record achieved as an Open competitor
 Lev Lobodin  Holds Masters M35 Record achieved as an Open competitor
 Carlos Lopes  Holds Masters M35 Record achieved as an Open competitor
 Edith Masai  Holds Masters W35 Record achieved as an Open competitor
 Josef Matoušek   Set M35 Javelin record en route to 1960 Olympics
 Danny McFarlane  Holds Masters M35 Record achieved as an Open competitor
 Faina Melnik  Holds Masters W35 Record achieved as an Open competitor
 Irina Mikitenko  Holds Masters M35 Record achieved as an Open competitor 
 Kathryn Mitchell  Holds Masters W35 Record achieved as an Open competitor
 Steffi Nerius  Held Masters W35 Record achieved as an Open competitor
 Merlene Ottey  has not competed in a Masters event but holds several Masters World Records
 Björn Otto  Holds Masters W35 Record achieved as an Open competitor
 Joanne Pavey  Holds multiple Masters Records achieved as an Open competitor
 Larisa Peleshenko  Holds Masters W35 Record achieved as an Open competitor
 Aurelia Pentón  Holds Masters W35 Record achieved as an Open competitor
 Elisabetta Perrone  Holds Masters W35 Record achieved as an Open competitor
 Yekaterina Podkopayeva  has not competed in a Masters event but holds several Masters World Records
 Maricica Puică  has not competed in a Masters event but holds several Masters World Records
 Félix Sánchez  ran a superior time to M35 World record in the World Championships
 Kerry Saxby-Junna  Holds Masters W35 Record achieved as an Open competitor
 Marina Stepanova  Holds Masters W35 Record achieved as an Open competitor
 Jenn Suhr  Holds Masters W35 Record achieved as an Open competitor
 William Tanui   Ran a 1500m superior to the M35 record in Open competition
 Dragutin Topic  Holds Masters M35 Record achieved as an Open competitor
 Kevin Toth Threw shot put further than M35 World Record just before being banned for doping
 Simon Vroemen   Holds Masters M35 Record achieved as an Open competitor
 Ibrahima Wade  Holds Masters M35 Record achieved as an Open competitor
 John Walker  Holds Masters M35 Record achieved as an Open competitor
 Jan Železný  has not competed in a Masters event but holds two Masters World Records

See also
World Masters Athletics Championships
Masters Athletics
USATF Masters Outdoor Championships
USATF Masters Indoor Championships

References

External links
 USA Olympians that have competed as Masters Track and Field Athletes
NFL athletes that later competed in Masters Track and Field
Sullivan Award winners that later competed in Masters Track and Field

 
Masters Athletes